Maloye Kolesovo is a rural locality (a selo) in Kabansky District, Republic of Buryatia, Russia. The population was 213 as of 2010. There are 3 streets.

Geography 
Maloye Kolesovo is located 12 km northwest of Kabansk (the district's administrative centre) by road. Bolshoye Kolesovo is the nearest rural locality.

References 

Rural localities in Kabansky District